Talovka is a rural locality (a settlement) in Baranovskoye Rural Settlement, Nikolayevsky District, Volgograd Oblast, Russia. The population was 87 as of 2010.

Geography 
Talovka is located in stepp of Transvolga, 68 km ENE of Nikolayevsk (the district's administrative centre) by road. Krasny Meliorator is the nearest rural locality.

References 

Rural localities in Nikolayevsky District, Volgograd Oblast